Mustafa Kadhim Dagher Al-Saamah (born 29 November 1995) is an Iraqi athlete specialising in the discus throw. He represented his country at the 2017 World Championships without reaching the final. He won a silver medal at the 2018 Asian Games.

International competitions

References

1995 births
Living people
Iraqi male discus throwers
World Athletics Championships athletes for Iraq
Athletes (track and field) at the 2014 Asian Games
Athletes (track and field) at the 2018 Asian Games
Medalists at the 2018 Asian Games
Asian Games medalists in athletics (track and field)
Asian Games silver medalists for Iraq
Islamic Solidarity Games medalists in athletics
20th-century Iraqi people
21st-century Iraqi people